Pishill  is a hamlet in Pishill with Stonor civil parish about  north of Henley-on-Thames in South Oxfordshire.

History
The earliest known records of the toponym of Pishill are 13th-century. The Book of Fees records Pushulle in 1219 and Pushull in 1247. It is derived from the Latin pisum for pea and the Old English for hill, and means "hill where peas grew". The dedication of the Church of England parish church is unknown. It was originally an 11th-century Norman building but it was rebuilt in 1854. One of the stained glass windows was made in 1967 by John Piper and Patrick Reyntiens. The window depicts a sword, symbolic of the martyrdom of Paul the Apostle, with an open book in front of it to suggest that the pen is mightier than the sword.

Southwest of the parish church is an 18th-century barn that seems to include the remains of an early 14th-century chapel. This may be linked with the D'Oyley family of Oxford, who held the manor of Pishill and in 1406 received a licence to build a chapel at the manor house that used to be in the village. With the support of the Stonors and Jesuit priests who stayed with them, a number of Pishill families remained Roman Catholic throughout the 16th, 17th and 18th centuries. In 1878 the Church of England incumbent of Pishill reported that a third of the 200 population of his parish were Roman Catholic. Pishill was a separate civil parish until 1922, when it was made part of the new civil parish of Pishill with Stonor.

Amenities

Pishill has a 17th-century pub, the Crown Inn.

References

Bibliography

External links

 Pishill with Stonor Parish Council

Villages in Oxfordshire